In internal combustion engines, water injection, also known as anti-detonant injection (ADI), can spray water into the incoming air or fuel-air mixture, or directly into the combustion chamber to cool certain parts of the induction system where "hot points" could produce premature ignition. In jet engines — particularly early turbojets or engines in which it is not practical or desirable to have an afterburner — water injection may be used to increase engine thrust, particularly at low-altitudes and at takeoff.

Water injection was used historically to increase the power output of military aviation engines for short durations, such as during aerial combat or takeoff. However it has also been used in motor sports and notably in drag racing. In Otto cycle engines, the cooling effects of water injection also enables greater compression ratios by reducing engine knocking (detonation). Alternatively, this reduction in engine knocking in Otto cycle engines means that some applications gain significant performance when water injection is used in conjunction with a supercharger, turbocharger, or modifications such as aggressive ignition timing.

Depending on the engine, improvements in power and fuel efficiency can also be obtained solely by injecting water. Water injection may also be used to reduce NOx or carbon monoxide emissions.

Composition of fluid
Many water injection systems use a mixture of water and alcohol (often close to 50/50), with trace amounts of water-soluble oil. The water provides the primary cooling effect due to its great density and high heat absorption properties. The alcohol is combustible, and also serves as an antifreeze for the water. The main purpose of the oil is to prevent corrosion of water injection and fuel system components.

Use in aircraft

Water injection has been used in both reciprocating and turbine aircraft engines. When used in a turbine engine, the effects are similar, except that normally preventing detonation is not the primary goal. Water is normally injected either at the compressor inlet or in the diffuser just before the combustion chambers. Adding water increases the mass being accelerated out of the engine, increasing thrust and it also serves to cool the turbines. Since temperature is normally the limiting factor in turbine engine performance at low altitudes, the cooling effect lets the engine run at higher RPM with more fuel injected and more thrust created without overheating.

Prior to the widespread adoption of afterburning engines, some first-generation jet fighters used water injection to provide a moderate boost in performance. For example, the late-model variant of the Lockheed F-80 Shooting Star, the F-80C, used water injection on its Allison J33-A-35 engine.

Early versions of the Boeing 707 fitted with Pratt & Whitney JT3C turbojets used water injection for extra takeoff power, as did Boeing 747-100 and 200 aircraft fitted with Pratt & Whitney JT9D-3AW and -7AW turbofans; this system was not included in later versions fitted with more powerful engines. The BAC One-Eleven airliner also used water injection for its Rolls-Royce Spey turbofan engines. Filling the tanks with jet fuel instead of water led to the Paninternational Flight 112 crash.

In 1978, Olympic Airways Flight 411 had to abort and return to its take-off airport due to a failure of the water injection system or its processes.

Use in automobiles
A limited number of road vehicles with forced induction engines from manufacturers such as Chrysler have included water injection. The 1962 Oldsmobile Jetfire was delivered with the Turbo Jetfire engine. 

In 2015 BMW has introduced a version of their high performance M4 coupe, the M4 GTS, that combines water injection with intercooling. The car was featured in the 2015 MotoGP season as the official safety car for the series and was released for the commercial market in 2016. As per BMW example, current engine developments featuring water injection seem to concentrate on the effect of “Performance Improvement”. But  by the mid 2020s, engine development will shift focus also on improved fuel consumption, due to the pressure on  emissions reduction and related regulations.

Bosch, which co-developed the technology with BMW, offers a water injection system named WaterBoost for other manufacturers. The company claims up to 5% increase in engine performance, up to 4% decrease in  emissions and up to 13% improvement in fuel economy. Similar results were reported in "Water Injection - High Power and High Efficiency combined" 

Water Injection and cooled exhaust gas recirculation (EGR) could be seen as competitive technologies: it has been demonstrated that at medium load a 40-50 % Water-to-Fuel Ratio (WFR) with Port Water Injection (PWI) has the same effect as an EGR-rate of 10%, which is seen as relatively limited even for petrol engines.

On-Board Water Generation 

Surveys asking customers about their willingness to regularly fill up an additional operating fluid have demonstrated that the acceptance level is limited. Therefore, the need for refilling is considered as one of the main barrier for the mass adoption of Water Injection. A key enabler is the development of on-board water generation system to run in close loop system, especially in order to guarantee consistent low level of emissions (engine  emissions will be raised if the water supply is exhausted). Three major sources can be investigated:
 Harvesting air humidity from ambient (e.g. by A/C condensate)
 Surface Water (e.g. rain water collected from vehicle body)
 Exhaust Gas Condensate
The first two variants are highly dependent on weather ambient conditions with sufficiently high humidity levels or driver habits (no A/C operation wanted). Consequently, an adequate supply of water cannot be ensured. In contrast, condensing of water vapour formed during the combustion of gasoline is a reliable source of water: there is approximately a volume of 1L of water vapour in exhaust per each liter of gasoline fuel consumed. 
In October 2019, Hanon Systems together with FEV presented an Audi TT Sport demonstrator equipped with water injection operating as a closed system thanks to a Hanon Systems "Water Harvesting System".

Use in diesel
A 2016 study combined water injection with exhaust gas recirculation. Water was injected into the exhaust manifold of a diesel engine and, by opening the exhaust valve during the induction stroke, the injected water and some of the exhaust gas was drawn back into the cylinder. The effect was an 85% reduction in NOx emissions, but at the cost of increased soot emissions.

See also
 Crower six stroke

References

Further reading

External links
 

Engine technology
Water Injection